Maryland Route 259 (MD 259) is a state highway in the U.S. state of Maryland. Known as Greenock Road, the highway runs  from MD 794 in Bristol north to MD 408 near Lothian. MD 259 was constructed in the late 1920s and early 1930s.

Route description

MD 259 begins at an acute intersection with MD 794 (Southern Maryland Boulevard) in Bristol. MD 794 leads to MD 258 (Bay Front Road) and MD 4.   MD 259 heads northeast as a two-lane undivided road that passes southeast of the historic James Owens Farm. The highway reaches its northern terminus at an intersection with MD 408 (Mount Zion-Marlboro Road) at the hamlet of Greenock southwest of Lothian.

History
MD 259 was constructed as a gravel road from MD 4 (now MD 408) at Greenock southwest to north of the James Owens Farm in 1928. The highway was completed southwest to MD 416 (now MD 794) in Bristol in 1933 and 1934. MD 259 was paved in 1949.

Junction list

See also

References

External links

MDRoads: MD 259
MD 259 at AARoads.com

259
Maryland Route 259